Brittni De La Mora (née Ruiz), known professionally as Jenna Presley, is an American former pornographic film actress.

Career
While in college and working at a Santa Barbara strip club, a few producers asked Presley if she was interested in making "romance movies".
Presley entered the adult film industry in September 2005 when she was 18 years old. In 2010, she was named by Maxim as one of the 12 top female stars in porn. Complex ranked her 17th on its list of "The Top 100 Hottest Porn Stars (Right Now)" in 2011.

After leaving the pornography industry, Presley preached at Cornerstone Church of San Diego.

Personal life
During her time in the adult film industry, Presley used crystal meth, heroin, and cocaine (to try to lose weight), as well as ecstasy and oxycontin.
She witnessed her boyfriend being fatally-stabbed by a motorcycle gang.

After three years in the industry, Presley's grandparents took her to the Rock Church in San Diego, where "she raised her hand to receive Jesus as her personal Lord and Savior" after hearing a sermon by preacher Miles McPherson. Further inspired by Rachel Collins, a Christian pastor at XXX Church, Presley left the adult film industry in December 2012 after she completed her last scene in Las Vegas. In a 2013 interview, Presley discussed a book in the making about her past struggles with drugs in the industry and about her new faith in Christianity. In August 2013, she appeared on The View with Craig Gross, pastor of the Triple X Church, to discuss her conversion to Christianity. 

In 2016, Presley married Richard De La Mora, a pastor at Cornerstone Church.

Awards
2006 NightMoves Award – Best New Starlet (Fan's Choice)

References

External links

 Official website
 Instagram
 Twitter
 YouTube
 
 
 

Year of birth missing (living people)
American Protestant ministers and clergy
American female erotic dancers
American erotic dancers
American pornographic film actresses
Living people
21st-century American women